Kot Proya is a small village in Pakistan located about a mile inland from the Ali Pur Road connecting Ali Pur and Gujranwala, encompassing an area of 500 acres. It was founded during the time of Emperor Aurengzeb.

It is located in the district of Gujranwala about 18 km west of Gujranwala City, Punjab, Pakistan and about 90 km NW of the provincial capital Lahore. It is surrounded by many villages which provide a major portion of the local labour force.

The closest major town is Kalaske Cheema.

 Country: Pakistan
 Province: Punjab
 District: Gujranwala
 Dial Code: 055
 Post Code: 52071
 Population: ~1,000
 Christian Minority: 30

Villages in Gujranwala District